Rabbs Prairie is an unincorporated community in Fayette County, Texas, United States.

External links
 RABBS PRAIRIE, TX Handbook of Texas Online.

Unincorporated communities in Fayette County, Texas
Unincorporated communities in Texas